Belgian Australians (Dutch: Belgische Australiërs)
(French: Australiens Belges) are Australian citizens of Belgian ancestry or Belgian-born people who reside in Australia.

Belgian Australians
This is a list of notable Belgian Australians and their descendants.

 Ted Baillieu, Liberal Party of Australia Premier of Victoria (2010–2013) and Member of the Legislative Assembly for the Electoral district of Hawthorn since 1999
 William Baillieu, philanthropist, businessman and parliamentarian
 Wim Broeckx, (1961) dual Australian – Belgian nationality since 2018, Currently Freelance Ballet teacher, Ballet Coach and Artistic Advisor, Previous Head of Pre Professional Program Queensland Ballet, Artistic Director Prix de Lausanne International Ballet Competition, Assistant Director Dutch National Ballet, Director Dance Department Royal Conservatoire, Netherlands.
 Mathias Cormann, Secretary General, OECD. Former Liberal Senator for Western Australia  and Australian Minister for Finance between 2013 and 2020. 
 Wouter De Backer (Gotye), ARIA Award-winning singer-songwriter.
 Chantale Delrue, visual artist, member of Tasmanian Honour Roll of Women
 Nicolas Hyeronimus (1808–1860), pioneering innkeeper, merchant, pastoralist and politician in colonial New South Wales, Australia; member of the New South Wales Legislative Assembly as inaugural member for the electoral district of Wellington
 Karel Axel Lodewycks, author and Chief Librarian of the Melbourne University Library
 Pierre Ryckmans, Professor of Chinese Studies at the University of Sydney
 Bradley Wiggins, born in Belgium to an Australian father

See also

 Belgians
 French Australians
 Dutch Australians
 German Australians

References

Further reading

 K.A.Lodewycks (1988), "Belgians", in James Jupp(ed.) (1988), The Australian People. An Encyclopedia of the Nation, Its People and Their Origins, North Ryde, NSW, Angus and Robertson, Pages 284–285. 
 K.A.Lodewycks (1988), The Belgians in Australia, Bowen Hills, Queensland, Boolarong Publications. 
 K.A.Lodewycks (2001), "Belgians", in James Jupp (ed.) (2001), The Australian People. An Encyclopedia of the Nation, Its People and Their Origins, Revised edition, Cambridge, UK, Cambridge University Press, Pages 185–186. 

Australians
Belgian emigrants to Australia
 
European Australian